This is a list of visual illusions.

See also

 Adaptation (eye)
 Alice in Wonderland syndrome
 Auditory illusion
 Camouflage
 Contingent perceptual aftereffect
 Contour rivalry
 Depth perception
 Emmert's law
 Entoptic phenomenon
 Gestalt psychology
 Infinity pool
 Kinetic depth effect
 Mirage
 Multistable perception
 Op Art

Notes

External links

 Optical Illusion Examples by Great Optical Illusions
 Optical Illusions & Visual Phenomena by Michael Bach
 Optical Illusions Database by Mighty Optical Illusions
 Optical illusions and perception paradoxes by Archimedes Lab
 https://web.archive.org/web/20100419004856/http://ilusaodeotica.com/ hundreds of optical illusions
 Project LITE Atlas of Visual Phenomena
 Akiyoshi's illusion pages Professor Akiyoshi KITAOKA's anomalous motion illusions
 Spiral Or Not? by Enrique Zeleny, Wolfram Demonstrations Project
 Magical Optical Illusions by Rangki
 Hunch Optical Illusions by Hunch
 Optical Illusions by Ooh, My Brain!

 
Optical phenomena
Consciousness studies
Articles containing video clips